The C&C 26 Wave is a Canadian sailboat, that was designed by C&C designer Robert W. Ball and first built in 1988.

Despite its name, the C&C 26 Wave is a development of the C&C 27 Mark V and not the C&C 26.

Production
The boat was built by C&C Yachts in Canada, starting in 1988, but it is now out of production.

Design
The C&C 26 Wave is a small recreational keelboat, built predominantly of fiberglass, with wood trim. It has a masthead sloop rig, a transom-hung rudder and a fixed wing keel. It displaces  and carries  of iron ballast.

The boat is fitted with a Universal M-12 diesel engine.

The design has a PHRF racing average handicap of 219 with a high of 231 and low of 210.

See also
List of sailing boat types

Similar sailboats
Beneteau First 26
Beneteau First 265
C&C 26
Contessa 26
Dawson 26
Discovery 7.9
Grampian 26
Herreshoff H-26
Hunter 26
Hunter 26.5
Hunter 260
Hunter 270
MacGregor 26
Mirage 26
Nash 26
Nonsuch 26
Outlaw 26
Paceship PY 26
Parker Dawson 26
Pearson 26
Sandstream 26
Tanzer 26
Yamaha 26

References

Keelboats
1980s sailboat type designs
Sailing yachts
Sailboat type designs by Robert W. Ball
Sailboat types built by C&C Yachts